Đông Nam Bộ (literally "Southeast region") is a region in Vietnam. This region includes one municipality, Ho Chi Minh City; and five provinces: Đồng Nai, Bình Dương, Bà Rịa–Vũng Tàu province, Bình Phước and Tây Ninh. The two southern provinces Ninh Thuận and Bình Thuận are sometimes seen as part of the Southeast region. This region is the most economically developed region in Vietnam. In 2006, this region contributed 148,000 billion VND (equal to $9.25 billion) out of 251,000 billion VND to the state budget.  This region is also the most highly urbanized in the country with more than 50% people living in urban areas (while the equivalent figure for Vietnam is just 25%).

Southeast (Đông Nam) - 6 provinces: Bình Phước, Tây Ninh, Bình Dương, Đồng Nai, Bà Rịa–Vũng Tàu and Ho Chi Minh City (formerly and, as of today, informally known as Saigon)

Provinces

Principal cities
Ho Chi Minh City is the largest city of Vietnam, with a population of more than 7.2 million; the metropolitan population is nearly 10 million.
Bien Hoa is an industrial city where Bien Hoa Air Base is located. It is part of the Ho Chi Minh City Metropolitan Area.
Vũng Tàu is the hub of Vietnam's petroleum industry, as well as being a tourist destination.
Tây Ninh City, where Caodaism was born.
Thủ Dầu Một, an industrial city. It is actually a part of Ho Chi Minh City Metropolitan Area
Đồng Xoài City, the capital of Bình Phước Province.

Transport
Tan Son Nhat International Airport is the largest airport in Vietnam, with the passenger traffic of 8.5 million in 2006 but it will be replaced by a larger newly constructed airport, Long Thanh International Airport after 2025. Lien Khuong Airport is an important airport in this area.
Saigon Port and several deep-water ports in Bà Rịa–Vũng Tàu are the busiest ports in the country. National Road 1 and National Road 51, and TransAsia Highway are the principal roads in this region.

References

 
Regions of Vietnam
Geography of Vietnam